The 2018–19 season was 19th season in the top Ukrainian football league for FC Mariupol. Mariupol competed in Premier League, Ukrainian Cup and UEFA Europa League.

Players

Squad information

Transfers

In

Out

Pre-season and friendlies

Competitions

Overall

Premier League

League table

Results summary

Results by round

Matches

Ukrainian Cup

UEFA Europa League

Statistics

Appearances and goals

|-
! colspan=16 style=background:#dcdcdc; text-align:center| Goalkeepers

|-
! colspan=16 style=background:#dcdcdc; text-align:center| Defenders

|-
! colspan=16 style=background:#dcdcdc; text-align:center| Midfielders

 
 

|-
! colspan=16 style=background:#dcdcdc; text-align:center| Forwards

|-
! colspan=16 style=background:#dcdcdc; text-align:center| Players transferred out during the season

Last updated: 31 May 2019

Goalscorers

Last updated: 31 May 2019

Clean sheets

Last updated: 31 May 2019

Disciplinary record

Last updated: 31 May 2019

References

External links
Official website

FC Mariupol
Mariupol
Mariupol